Nontraditional Love is a dystopian novel written by the Russian writer Rafael Grugman and describes an alternative future where heterosexuality is outlawed. 
The novel was first published by Liberty Publishing House in November 2008 and nominated for the 2009 Rossica Translation Prize. Nontraditional Love combines satire with Orwellian themes for a unique look at morals and society.

Plot
The scene is the twenty-third century. USA. 
Nontraditional Love describes a homosexual world in which mixed-sex marriages are forbidden. The homosexual society is intolerant of dissidents. Intimacy between the sexes is rejected. World history and the classics of world literature, such as Tolstoy, Shakespeare, Dumas... have been falsified in order to support the ideology of this opposite world.

At the heart of the novel is a love story between a man and a woman who are forced to hide their feelings and pass as homosexuals.
After Robert Marcus' secret wife Liza abandoned him for another man, he decides to make a radical change in life and become a normal gay man. His first male partner should have been Jacob Stein, a retired policeman, but during their first date Jacob dies.
Is it a murder or an accident? The FBI begins an investigation and accuses Robert of killing Jacob. The situation becomes complicated because Jacob Stein in his youth made the fateful mistake by having sex with a woman and Liza is Jacob's daughter...

The plot follows Robert Marcus, a heterosexual who has a clandestine affair with Liza.  They hide from authorities by feigning marriage to the same gendered persons of another couple.  All four live in a two family house.  At night, they secretly change rooms to sleep their lovers while carrying on as homosexual couples during the day.  Normal reproduction is also illegal, but the couples pretend to have artificially inseminated children, the boy being raised by the men and the girl being raised by the women.  After a while Liza leaves this arrangement.  Robert tries to make a go of converting to being homosexual to make life easier for himself.  He meets an older man who dies in his bed.  Robert is accused of murder, confirming that heterosexuals are a menace to society.  The rest of the book follows Robert in a riveting 1984-Kafkaesque experience.

In the second book, I Was a Man in a Past Life, the main characters' adventures continue. We learn that Liza Conde is descended from the Princes of Conde, a branch of the Bourbon dynasty, which died out in the nineteenth century. Hypothetically, she has a claim to the French throne, which accounts for the murders of some of her close relatives, committed by a descendant of Napoleon Bonaparte who has dreams of resurrecting the empire.

Publication history

The novel was first published in New York by Liberty Publishing House in 2008. The book was translated from Russian by Geoffrey Carlson. 

In Russia, the novel was first published in Moscow in 2020 under the title "Запретная любовь. Forbidden Love", — Russia, Moscow, Rodina, 2020

E-book: The Twenty Third Century: Nontraditional Love,  — Strelbytskyy Multimedia Publishing, 2017

Critical reception 

Mariano Martín Rodríguez, Doctor in Philology and a member of the research group on utopias and future history HISTOPIA (Universidad Autónoma de Madrid) wrote in (Anti)Gay Utopian Fiction in English and Romance Languages: an Overview: ‘We can doubt whether the celebration of a hypothetically persecuted heterosexuality as a symbol of the right to difference in later gay dystopias... Among them, there is a relatively recent one, written in Russian and translated into English in 2008, Rafael Grugman‘s Nontraditional Love.  As it is the case in earlier examples of homosexual domination, at least from “The Crooked Man” onwards, the heterosexual male hero-victim in this novel must come to terms with the fact that he is a member of a rejected minority, from which he and his female partner must hide their love through family arrangements with fellow-minded and orientated couples.  In this future Earth, a global accident has turned most people from heterosexual to homosexual, as well as their descendants, while former homosexuals have become heterosexuals, bringing about a full reversal.  Biological maternity had to be replaced by gestational surrogacy for both gay and lesbian couples, now forming the majority...
 
Regarding Grugman's heterosexist ‘traditional‘ perspective, it may be of interest to compare Nontraditional Love with an earlier lesbian narrative, Cy Jung's Hétéro par-ci, homo par le rat (1999), which is set in a fictional world similar to the one imagined by Grugman...'
 
In Rodríguez  opinion, ‘Consciously or not, Grugman‘s narrative echoes current discourses against gay and lesbian assertiveness underlying legislation enacted to prevent any alleged gay proselytizism... Homosexuality is thus presented as a threat to society at large, and Grugman just turns this threat into reality in his dystopia. At any rate, Grugman offers a late specimen of anti-gay utopia in a period when homosexuality had virtually disappeared from the utopian genre, except for a few appropriations of it by the gays themselves, after the long silence in the closet.’<ref>Mariano Martín Rodríguez, (Anti)Gay Utopian Fiction in English and Romance Languages: an Overview’’, MORUS – Utopia e Renascimento, v. 11, n. 1, 2016, p. 217-218 </ref>

Debbie Pope writes in March 2016, Issue 8 of Lateral Magazine: The freedom of a genre: Sexuality in speculative fiction:
'In another twist of today's society, Nontraditional Love'' by Rafael Grugman (2008) puts together an upside-down society where heterosexuality is outlawed, and homosexuality is the norm. A ‘traditional’ family unit consists of two dads with a surrogate mother. Alternatively, two mothers, one of whom bares a child. In a nod to the always-progressive Netherlands, this country is the only country progressive enough to allow opposite sex marriage. This is perhaps the most obvious example of cognitive estrangement. It puts the reader in the shoes of the oppressed by modelling an entire world of opposites around a fairly “normal” everyday heterosexual protagonist. A heterosexual reader would not only be able to identify with the main character, but be immersed in a world as oppressive and bigoted as the real world has been for homosexuals and the queer community throughout history.

“Politically, I’d give this book five stars for what it attempts and accomplishes. However, as an overall enjoyment experience, I’d have to give this book four stars. While I was pretty gripped to the story, I wasn’t really emotionally involved enough, which is my requirement for giving five stars. But if you like Kafka’s “The Trial” and Terry Gilliam's film “Brasil”, this is definitely the book for you”.

References

2008 American novels
Bisexuality-related fiction
Dystopian novels
American science fiction novels
Novels set in the 23rd century
Novels set in the United States
American erotic novels
Novels with gay themes
2000s LGBT novels
American LGBT novels
Russian LGBT novels
2008 LGBT-related literary works